Frank Joseph "Dolie" Doljack (October 5, 1907 – January 23, 1948) was a player in Major League Baseball.

Frank started playing ball on Cleveland sandlots.  He won the Babe Ruth Home Run Trophy in Class D in 1928. In 1929, while also playing winter ball in the Coast League, he signed on with the Tigers. He played outfielder for the Detroit Tigers in the thirties. He played in the 1934 World Series. Frank also played basketball, was an expert swimmer, and hunted in northern Michigan in the off season. His four brothers all played baseball too. He was a manager for the boxer Lloyd Marshall.

Frank died in 1948 due to a weakened heart from childhood rheumatic fever.

Sources

1907 births
1948 deaths
Detroit Tigers players
Cleveland Indians players
Major League Baseball left fielders
Major League Baseball center fielders
Major League Baseball right fielders
Baseball players from Cleveland